Anna Jekiełek-Ciesielska (29 December 1937 – 25 October 2021) was a Polish set and costume designer.

Biography 
She began her studies at the Department of Interior Architecture and Industrial Design at the Jan Matejko Academy of Fine Arts, then she moved to the Department of Stage Design. She graduated in 1967. For two years she worked with the TV Center in Cracow. She was also associated with the Teatr Sensacji "Kobra" ("Kobra" Sensation Theater) in Warsaw and the TV Theater in Łódź.

Since 1975 she worked in film groups in Warsaw, mainly in Andrzej Wajda's Zespół Filmowy „X” ("X" Film Group) and in Zespół Filmowy TOR (Tor Film Group), later also in Zespół Filmowy "Oko" ("Oko" Film Group") and "Perspektywa". She was an advisor to the Kraków University of Economics.

Jekiełek made stage sets for the plays in Teatr Nowy in Warsaw, Stefan Jaracz Theatre in Łódź and Teatr Dramatyczny in Legnica.

She was a member of Stowarzyszenie Filmowców Polskich (Polish Filmmakers Association).

Filmography

Set design 
 1973: Nie ma ptaków połowicznych (TV show)
 1980: Głosy
 1981: Wolny strzelec (TV film)
 1989: Litość Boga (TV show)
 1989: Odbicia (TV show)

Costume design 
 1976: Kradzież (TV film)
 1984: Granica (TV show)
 2016: Kury (short film)

Interior decoration (selection) 
 1976–1977: Polskie drogi (TV series; episodes 7–11)
 1978: Zmory
 1978: Wśród nocnej ciszy
 1979: Kung-fu
 1980: Z biegiem lat, z biegiem dni... (TV series)
 1980: Nasze podwórko (TV series)
 1981: Dreszcze
 1982: Wielki Szu
 1983: Wir
 1983: Przeznaczenie
 1983: Kartka z podróży
 1985: Sezon na bażanty
 1989: Marcowe migdały
 1990: Ucieczka z kina „Wolność”

Theatre

Set design 
 1981: Ojciec (Teatr Nowy in Warsaw)
 1982: Lęki poranne (Stefan Jaracz Theatre in Łódź)
 1982: Ołtarz wzniesiony sobie (Stefan Jaracz Theatre in Łódź)
 1982: Czerwone pantofelki (Teatr Dramatyczny in Legnica)

References

External links 

1937 births
2021 deaths
Polish interior designers
Polish scenic designers
Polish costume designers
Jan Matejko Academy of Fine Arts alumni
Film people from Kraków